The 1938 Wayne Tartars football team represented Wayne University (later renamed Wayne State University) as an independent during the 1938 college football season. In their seventh year under head coach Joe Gembis, the Tartars compiled a 2–6 record and were outscored by opponents, 179 to 106. team defeated Akron (16–0) and Buffalo (35–0), but lost to Michigan State (34–6), Louisville (14–12), Michigan State Normal (20–7), Ohio (52–7), Toledo (39–20), and Central Michigan (20–3).

The 1938 team captain, George Gembis, became the first Wayne player to be selected in the National Football League Draft. He was selected by the Brooklyn Dodgers with the 115th overall pick in the 1939 NFL Draft.

Schedule

References

Wayne
Wayne State Warriors football seasons
Wayne Tartars football